Eldridge Reeves Johnson (February 6, 1867 in Wilmington, Delaware – November 14, 1945 in Moorestown, New Jersey) was an American businessman and engineer who founded the Victor Talking Machine Company in 1901 and built it into the leading American producer of phonographs and phonograph records and one of the leading phonograph companies in the world at the time. Victor was the corporate predecessor of RCA Records.

Biography

Early life
Johnson was born in Wilmington, Delaware on February 6, 1867 to Asa S. Johnson and Caroline Reeves Johnson. Upon his mother's death in 1869 he was sent to live with his mother's sister and her husband on their farm in northern Kent County near Smyrna.

Asa remarried, and at age ten young Johnson moved to Dover to live with his father and stepmother. Johnson attended the Delaware Academy with the hopes of attending college, but he was a poor student and upon his graduation in 1882 at age fifteen, the Academy's director told him, "You are too Goddamned dumb to go to college. Go and learn a trade."

Thus, in 1883 Johnson was apprenticed to J. Lodge & Son, a machine repair shop in Philadelphia. In 1888, his apprenticeship was completed and Johnson became a machinist at the recently established Scull Machine Shop across the Delaware River in Camden, New Jersey. John Warwick Scull had graduated from Lehigh University the previous year with a degree in mechanical engineering, and his father Andrew financed the purchase of the building at 108 N. Front Street in Camden for his son to set up shop in.

Later that year, John W. Scull died suddenly. Johnson became foreman and manager, while Scull's father continued on as owner. At the time of his death, John W. Scull had been working on the development of a bookbinding machine. Johnson completed the design of the machine but shortly thereafter decided to head west to seek his fortune. He ultimately made it as far west as Washington State, but the work Johnson found in the west was as a manual laborer. By 1891, he had returned to Philadelphia.

Eldridge R. Johnson Manufacturing Company
During Johnson's absence, Scull had been unable to successfully market the bookbinding machine. Upon Johnson's return east, Scull proposed a partnership. In 1894, Johnson bought out Scull's share of the company and the Eldridge R. Johnson Manufacturing Company was born.

In addition to the manufacture of wire stitching and bookbinding machines, Johnson's shop executed a variety of smaller jobs involving steam models and machine alterations. A customer named Henry Whitaker brought a manually driven, hand-cranked Berliner Gramophone, developed by Emile Berliner, into Johnson's shop and asked Johnson to design a spring driven motor for it.  Johnson did so, but Whitaker found the result unsatisfactory.

Johnson was immediately captivated by the Gramophone; of his initial introduction, Johnson later wrote that “the little instrument was badly designed. It sounded much like a partially educated parrot with a sore throat and a cold in the head.  But the little wheezy instrument caught my attention and held it fast and hard.  I became interested in it as I had never been interested before in anything. It was exactly what I was looking for.”

In 1895, Johnson was recommended to the Berliner Gramophone company as a potential developer of a spring-driven motor.  While cylinder phonographs had been successfully equipped with clockwork motors, the disc playing Gramophone presented a number of design challenges in this regard.  Foremost was the drag that the needle and soundbox created when applied to the outer edge of the disc.  This required that the motor provide sufficient torque at start up while retaining a constant speed.  Representatives of the Berliner company were satisfied with Johnson's design, and within a year Johnson had begun producing motors for Berliner.

Johnson continued to refine the motor during this period, externalizing the motor and leveraging a triple ball based centrifugal governor design to maintain a constant speed.  Johnson also spent a winter in Philadelphia collaborating on various Gramophone refinements with Alfred C. Clark; the most significant of these was a vastly improved soundbox.  Along with Johnson's new motor, the Clark-Johnson soundbox became the foundation for Berliner's Improved Gramophone of 1897.

Consolidated Talking Machine Company
Around this time, Johnson began experimenting with recording and disc duplicating technologies under a cloud of secrecy. Johnson had long been dissatisfied with the raucous, scratchy sound of Berliner's discs and believed a better recording and mastering process could be developed. Berliner's process for creating master records involved coating a zinc disc with an acid-resistant fatty film and then scratching the coating away with a recording stylus. Berliner would then submerse the recorded disc in an acid bath to create deeper grooves. From this master, stampers could easily be made for mass production of records—a definite advantage over the difficult-to-duplicate wax cylinders of the Edison Phonograph.

Examining the Berliner discs under a microscope, Johnson recognized that the acid etched process was creating random jagged grooves in the records, which were excessively scratchy and noisy when played. Johnson began experimenting with melted down Edison wax cylinders in an attempt to bring the sonic benefits of the Bell-Tainter method of engraving in wax to lateral-cut Gramophone discs.

Johnson was successful in developing a satisfactory process of recording, but mass production still proved challenging. Whereas Berliner's zinc master easily electroplated to facilitate the master stampers, Johnson's wax discs were not. Johnson contacted C. K. Haddon, an associate from his J. Lodge and Son days who had access to electroplating machinery. Johnson provided Haddon with a fragment of a Gramophone disc, ostensibly to obscure the direction of his research.

After two years and an investment of $50,000, Johnson was prepared to enter the Gramophone record market in 1900; he incorporated as the Consolidated Talking Machine Company of Philadelphia, and began selling records as well as a variety of Gramophone models under this name. This brought Johnson directly into the bitter legal dispute between Berliner and their former partner, Frank Seaman; Seaman then sued Johnson in early 1901, and requested an injunction prohibiting Johnson from manufacturing and selling Gramophones. The injunction was denied, but Johnson was temporarily prevented from using variations on the word ‘Gramophone’. Though this decision was soon reversed, Johnson chose not to refer to his talking machine as a 'Gramophone'. On March 12, less than two weeks after the court decision, Johnson registered the ‘Victor’ trademark.

Victor Talking Machine Company

Legacy

Eldridge Johnson despised the pressures of big business and had never intended on becoming a business tycoon. In 1924, he suffered a nervous breakdown and was unable to make any decisions regarding Victor's affairs; The Victor Company nearly went bankrupt in 1925, and Johnson began to seriously consider retiring from the phonograph business.
After years of turning down prospective buyers, Johnson sold the Victor Talking Machine Company for $40 million to two banking firms in 1926, which, in turn, sold Victor to the Radio Corporation of America (RCA) in 1929. Johnson resigned as president of the company and largely withdrew from the public eye. He donated large sums of his vast wealth to various charities and established the Johnson Foundation for Research in Medical Physics at the University of Pennsylvania in 1929. The foundation, now called the Eldridge Reeves Johnson Foundation, is associated with the Department of Biochemistry and Biophysics at the University of Pennsylvania School of Medicine.

Although Johnson became weary of the responsibilities of running the world's largest phonograph company, the leisured life of a multimillionaire eventually became just as tedious to him and later he often said that he regretted selling the Victor Company. Having been in failing health for several years, Johnson died at the age of 78 on November 14, 1945, in Breidenhart, his home at Moorestown Township, New Jersey, after suffering a stroke days earlier. Johnson is buried in West Laurel Hill Cemetery, Bala Cynwyd, Pennsylvania.

On February 26, 1985, Johnson posthumously received the 1984 Grammy Trustee Award, given to persons who made a significant contribution in the field of recording. This award is on display at the Johnson Victrola Museum located in Dover, Delaware.

Patents
 , Sound recording and reproducing machine. 1905. [Filed, 1898]

References

External links
Time magazine article from December 20, 1926
The Marvelous Talking machine - Eldridge R. Johnson
Johnson Victrola Museum, http://www.uphs.upenn.edu/biocbiop/jf/jf.html
Eldridge Reeves Johnson Foundation, University of Pennsylvania
 Biography-West Laurel Hill Cemetery web site
"HOW A MAN WITH AN IDEA MADE MILLIONS IN TWELVE YEARS", New York Times Magazine, August 28, 1910, p9

1867 births
1945 deaths
Burials at West Laurel Hill Cemetery
People from Moorestown, New Jersey
People from Wilmington, Delaware
19th-century American businesspeople
20th-century American businesspeople
Grammy Award winners